The women's 200 metres event at the 2006 Commonwealth Games was held on March 22–23.

Medalists

Results

Heats
Qualification: First 3 of each heat (Q) and the next 4 fastest (q) qualified for the semifinals.

Wind:Heat 1: +0.8 m/s, Heat 2: +0.9 m/s, Heat 3: –0.2 m/s, Heat 4: –0.5 m/s

Semifinals
Qualification: First 4 of each semifinal (Q) qualified directly for the final.

Wind:Heat 1: +0.3 m/s, Heat 2: –0.5 m/s

Final
Wind: +0.6 m/s

References
Results

200
2006
2006 in women's athletics